Jan Abaza and Louisa Chirico were the defending champions, having won the event in 2013, but Chirico chose not to participate. Abaza partnered with Sanaz Marand, but lost in the final to Asia Muhammad and Taylor Townsend, 6–2, 6–1.

Seeds

Draw

References 
 Draw

Audi Melbourne Pro Tennis Classic - Doubles